The 2018 East Carolina Pirates football team represented East Carolina University in the 2018 NCAA Division I FBS football season. The Pirates, led by third-year head coach Scottie Montgomery, played their home games at Dowdy-Ficklen Stadium, and were members of the East Division in the American Athletic Conference. They finished the season 3–9, 1–7 in AAC play to finish in fifth place in the East Division.

On November 29, head coach Scottie Montgomery was fired. He finished at East Carolina with a three-year record of 9–26. Defensive coordinator David Blackwell was the interim head coach during their final game of the season. On December 3, ECU hired James Madison head coach Mike Houston as their new head coach.

Previous season
The Pirates finished the 2017 season 3–9, 2–6 in AAC play to finish in a three-way tie for fourth place in the East Division.

Preseason

Award watch lists
Listed in the order that they were released

AAC media poll
The AAC media poll was released on July 24, 2018, with the Pirates predicted to finish in last place in the AAC East Division.

Schedule

Schedule Source:

Game summaries

North Carolina A&T

Sources:

North Carolina

Sources:

at South Florida

Sources:

Old Dominion

Sources:

at Temple

Sources:

Houston

Sources:

UCF

Sources:

Memphis

Sources: 

The high-scoring affair features a combined 1,200 yards by the two teams. Holton Ahlers, in his second start in relief of Reid Herring, led the Pirates in both rushing (17 carries for 57 yards) and passing, completing 34 of his 62 passes for 449 yards (fourth in school history to Shane Carden's 480 in 2013, Blake Kemp's 465 in 2015, and Gardner Minshew's 463 in 217) and three touchdowns without an interception. Trevon Brown had 10 receptions for 193 yards (eighth in ECU history) and two of those touchdowns. The second of these tied the game at 31 midway through the third quarter, but the Pirates were outscored 28-17 the rest of the way in the loss.

at Tulane

UConn

at Cincinnati

at NC State

Note: This game was scheduled on October 2, 2018, to replace NC State's game vs. West Virginia and East Carolina's game at Virginia Tech, both of which were canceled due to Hurricane Florence. This game will not take place if either NC State or ECU qualifies for their respective conference championship.

References

East Carolina
East Carolina Pirates football seasons
East Carolina Pirates football